Cleota J. Collins (September 24, 1893 — July 7, 1976) was an American soprano singer and music educator. She was one of the founding members of the National Association of Negro Musicians in 1919.

Early life
Cleota Josephine Collins was born in Cleveland, Ohio, the daughter of Ira A. Collins and Josie Collins. Her father was a clergyman. Cleota Collins studied music at Ohio State University in Columbus, Ohio, and abroad in France and Italy, as the student of Emma Azalia Hackley, with further studies in New York.

Career
Cleota Collins "toured extensively". In 1924 she gave educational recitals at schools in Tennessee, Arkansas, Texas, Florida, North Carolina and South Carolina. She toured southern schools again in 1936 and in 1938. She taught voice and piano at Florida Baptist Academy, Sam Houston College, Tuskegee Institute, and Virginia State College in Petersburg, among other posts. She was one of the founding members of the National Association of Negro Musicians in 1919. She operated the Lacy School of Music and was a church music director in Cleveland in the 1930s.

In 1932, sculptor Henry Bannarn created a portrait bust of Cleota Collins; it was his earliest known work.

Personal life
Cleota Collins married George Corinth Lacy, a lawyer, in 1917. She married William Johnson Trent Sr., the president of Livingstone College, as his fourth wife, in 1953. She may have married a third time, as her grave marker is for "Cleota Collins Moore." She died in 1976, aged 83 years, in Pasadena, California. Her gravesite is in Angelus-Rosedale Cemetery.

References

External links
 Cleota Collins Moore's gravesite on Find a Grave.
 A 1921 photograph of Nora Douglas Holt, Cleota Collins Lacey, Portia Evans, Clarissa Hardy, Estelle E. Pinkney, Camille L. Nickerson and Gussie Rue Harris, Beinecke Library, Yale University.

1893 births
1976 deaths
Ohio State University College of Arts and Sciences alumni
Virginia State University faculty
Tuskegee University faculty
American sopranos
20th-century American singers
20th-century American women singers
American women academics